John Coard Taylor (January 1, 1901 – June 25, 1946) was an American track and field athlete who placed fifth in the men's 400 meters at the 1924 Summer Olympics. He was national champion in the 220-yd low hurdles in 1922 and IC4A champion in 1922 and 1923.

Biography

Taylor, descended from early Dutch settlers in New York City, was born in Cranford, New Jersey. He studied at Princeton University, which had a strong track and field team under coach Keene Fitzpatrick. In 1922, his junior year, Taylor won the 220-yard hurdles in 23.9 at the intercollegiate (IC4A) championships and in 24.6 at the AAU national championships; in the AAU meet he represented the New York Athletic Club. The following year he repeated as IC4A  champion in the low hurdles (23.8) and placed a close second behind Allen Woodring in the 440 yards; his estimated time, 48.4, ranked him third in the world that year.

Taylor won the 400 meters at the 1924 United States Olympic Trials in Cambridge, Massachusetts; he ran his lifetime best, 48.1, in the heats and repeated that time in the final, defeating the eventual Olympic silver medalist Horatio Fitch. At the Olympics in Paris Taylor qualified for the final; he remained in medal contention until his sore ankle gave way just before the finish. He eventually crawled across the finish line and placed fifth; the injury ended his athletic career.

In 1926 Taylor joined the Ethyl Gasoline Corporation; he was named the company's general sales manager in 1931 and vice president in charge of sales in 1937. Still working for Ethyl, Taylor died of a heart attack in New York City on June 25, 1946; he was survived by his wife and three sons.

Notes

References

1901 births
1946 deaths
20th-century American businesspeople
American male hurdlers
American male sprinters
Athletes (track and field) at the 1924 Summer Olympics
Princeton Tigers men's track and field athletes
People from Cranford, New Jersey
Sportspeople from Union County, New Jersey
Track and field athletes from New Jersey
Olympic track and field athletes of the United States